Genesis XIX is the sixteenth studio album by the German thrash metal band Sodom, released on 27 November 2020. It is the first studio album to feature returning guitarist Frank Blackfire since 1989's Agent Orange, as well as new members, guitarist Yorck Segatz and drummer Toni Merkel. As such, this album marks the first time in Sodom's history that they had recorded an album as a quartet rather than a trio.

Genesis XIX was produced by the band themselves, and like the previous album Decision Day (2016), its artwork was designed by Joe Petagno.

Track listing

Personnel

Sodom
 Tom Angelripper – bass, vocals
 Frank Blackfire – lead guitar
 Yorck Segatz – rhythm guitar
 Toni Merkel – drums

Production
 Sodom – production
 Siggi Bemm – engineer, mixing
 Joe Petagno – album cover

Charts

References

2020 albums
Sodom (band) albums
SPV/Steamhammer albums